The Sultanate of Elisu, also known as Elisou or Ilisu, was a sultanate in the 18th and 19th centuries.

Geography, population and government
Located mostly on the southern slope of the Caucasus Mountains in what is now northwest Azerbaijan, it extended from north of the mountain crest down to the Alazani River valley. Southeast in the lowlands was the Shirvan Khanate and northwest along the mountains were the Djaro-Belokani communities. Djaro-Belokan and Elisu were closely connected.
The mountainous north was inhabited by Tsakhurs and the low country by Azerbaijanis and Ingiloys (Muslim Georgians). The upper class was Tsakhur and Azerbaijani. In local usage a Sultan was below a Khan and above a Bey. The Sultanate was partly hereditary and partly elected by a Jamaat or assembly of notables. He was often confirmed by the Persian Shah. In a few cases he was imposed by whoever had a large army nearby.  For a few purposes the Sultan was almost a member of the Djaro-Belokani league.

History

The history of the Sultanate begins north of the mountains in the upper reaches of the Samur River (Rutulsky District) with the Tsakhur people – a western branch of the Lezgians. They formed Tsakhur Khanate and paid tribute to the Gazikumukh Shamkhalate. In the 15th century the Tsakhurs began moving to south over the mountain crest toward the Alazani River. They settled in the province of Hereti of Kakheti kingdom. In the early 17th century, Shah Abbas I of Persia took these lands from the king of Kakheti and granted them to the Dagestani feudal clans who enjoyed a degree of autonomy (Djar-Beylakan society, the sultanate of Ilisu). the area was an 'ulka' of the Shirvan Khanate. The rulers were also vassals of Persia and sometimes Ottoman Empire, depending on the relative power of each. At the beginning of the 18th century the capital moved south from the town of Tsakhur to İlisu and we now hear of the Elisu Sultanate. The Elisu Dynasty belonged to the Sunni Muslim denomination of Islam. The first ruler from was Sultan Adi Korklu Bey, who established the Elisu Sultante on March 8, 1563. He was of Tsakhur.
In 1711 there was a widespread anti-Persian movement which was partly a Sunni-Shia conflict. One of the leaders was Ali Sultan of Elisu. He captured a wide area and the Turks made him beylerbeg of Shaki. Nadir Shah drove the Turks out in 1735. When his army returned south Djaro-Belokani and Elisu rose again (1738). Nadir's brother was killed suppressing it and Ali-Sultan was forcibly replaced by his son. At some point Nadir himself entered Elisu and burned part of it.  As soon as he left the Begs, who had fled to the mountains, returned and replaced his puppet Sultan.

The Russians took over Kartli-Kakheti kingdom in 1801 and in 1803-1806 Pavel Tsitsianov pushed east to the Caspian.  In April General Gulyakov subdued the Djaro-Belokani area. They submitted and the Elisu Sultanate was included in their submission.  In October the mountaineers rose again with the help of the Gazikumukh Khanate and were defeated. In January 1804 Gulyakov chased them deep into the mountains and was killed. The Djaris did not pay tribute, blamed the Sultan and in 1805 he was replaced by Akhmed Khan who went to Tiflis (Tbilisi) to offer submission.  During the Persian War in 1826 Akhmed Khan was driven out by the Begs and replaced by Bala-Aga-Beg. The Russians returned, restored Akhmed and took Bala-Aga away in chains.

In 1830 the Djaris revolted and then submitted when troops approached. They were placed under the Djari Oblast with the Sultanate attached. The same year Daniyal Bek became Sultan. In 1842, when the Murid War was going poorly for the Russians, the Sultanate was placed under the Djaro-Belokani Military Okrug under General Schwartz. By 1844 Daniyal Sultan was either pushed or pulled into the arms of Shamil. Schwartz took Elisu by storm and the Sultanate was abolished. Daniyal fled and  became one of Shamil's best officers. His daughter married Shamil's son. When Shamil's movement collapsed he submitted for a full pardon. This last Sultan of Elisu died in the Ottoman Empire in 1873 at Istanbul. His descendants live today in Azerbaijan, in the сities of Qakh, Shaki, Nəbiağalı, Goychay, Ganja, and Baku, and use the surname Sultanov as male and Sultanova as female. Descendants also live in Turkey, in the city of Istanbul.

References
This was abstracted from the Russian and Azerbaijani Wikipedia, there being no obvious source in English.

Sources

External links

18th century in Azerbaijan
19th century in Azerbaijan
History of Dagestan
Ilisu